Love Without End may refer to:

 Love Without End (1961 film)
 Love Without End (1970 film)

See also
 "Love Without End, Amen", a song recorded by George Strait in 1990
 Endless Love (disambiguation)